Datuk Seri Saravanan Murugan (born 4 February 1968) commonly referred to as M. Saravanan is a Malaysian politician who has served as the Member of Parliament (MP) for Tapah since March 2008. He served as the Minister of Human Resources for the second term in the Barisan Nasional (BN) administration under former Prime Minister Ismail Sabri Yaakob from August 2021 to the collapse of the BN administration in November 2022 and the first term in the Perikatan Nasional (PN) administration under former Prime Minister Muhyiddin Yassin from March 2020 to the collapse of the PN administration in August 2021, Deputy Minister of Youth and Sports from May 2013 to the collapse of the BN administration in May 2018, Deputy Minister of Federal Territories and Urban Wellbeing from April 2009 to May 2013 and Deputy Minister of Federal Territories from March 2008 to April 2009. He is a member and Deputy President of the Malaysian Indian Congress (MIC), a component party of the BN coalition. From March 2020 to November 2022, he was the sole minister of the Indian ethnicity and MIC and one of the only two MIC candidates to be elected in the 2018 general election as well as the sole MIC candidate elected in the 2022 general election.

Saravanan began his political career in 1994 as a Secretary in MIC for the district of Titiwangsa. Prior to his active participation in Malaysian politics, Saravanan has worked several jobs as an office clerk, a member of the Malaysian police force, The Polis Diraja Malaysia (PDRM), and a Marketing Executive. He possesses a bachelor's degree in Business Administration from Hammersmith & West London College in England. In 2018, he pursued his Masters in Business Administration  (MBA) from the University of the West of Scotland and successfully completed in the year 2022.

Saravanan was a Senator prior to his election to the Dewan Rakyat (the lower house of Malaysia's Parliament). In the 2008 General Election, he contested for the seat of Tapah and won, defeating a candidate from the People's Justice Party (PKR). However, the MIC suffered widespread losses at the election, which left Saravanan as one of only three MIC members in the Dewan Rakyat. Despite his party's reduced presence in Parliament and the ruling Barisan Nasional coalition, Saravanan was appointed as a Deputy Minister from 2008 until 2013.

Within the MIC, Saravanan is seen as an ally of its President Samy Vellu, being elected as a vice-president of the MIC on Vellu's ticket and defending Vellu from opposition attacks. However he lost in the party re-election close fight for the position of Deputy President in 2015 to another MIC Vice-President, S. K. Devamany.

Early life 
Saravanan was born and raised in Pekeliling Flat Sentul.Saravanan was the only child of a rubber tapper and a housewife. Despite his family's financial struggles, Saravanan's parents ensured that he had completed his education to secure his future.

Childhood education 
Between 1975 and 1980, Saravanan attended Sekolah Jenis Kebangsaan (T) Jalan Fletcher in  Kuala Lumpur. 

Saravanan attended Sekolah Menengah Kebangsaan Jalan Temerloh, Kuala Lumpur from 1981 until 1986, where he continued to actively participate in extracurricular activities and once again appointed as a Prefect and the President of Indian Youth Club.

Youth and higher education 
Right after Saravanan completed his secondary school education, his father passed away. He was then responsible for supporting his family, which prompted him to work during the day and study during the night . The former Secretary-General of MIC, DP Vijendran, helped Saravanan land a job as an office clerk at Maika Holdings while pursuing his studies at Kolej TLMC, which managed a number of courses from Swansea Institute of Higher Education (University of Wales).

Saravanan joined Maika Holdings Berhad as an office boy. in 1989 and  In 1993, he furthered his studied in Hammersmith & West London College, England and was awarded a Diploma in Business and Management. Upon his return to Malaysia, Saravanan commenced his post as a Marketing Executive at Easy Call Pagers.In 2018, he pursued his Masters in Business Administration  (MBA) from the University of the West of Scotland and successfully completed in the year 2022.

Political career 
Saravanan was elected as Secretary in MIC for the district of Titiwangsa in 1994. Then, in 1997 he was appointed as the Secretary in MIC Federal Territory by Datuk Seri Samy Vellu, the former President of MIC Federal Territory. During his post as the Secretary of MIC Federal Territory, Saravanan also held the positions of Secretary of Pemuda MIC Nasional and Leader of MIC for the district of Titiwangsa. 

In 2004, the President of MIC nominated Saravanan as Senator, which allowed him to serve two terms in Dewan Negara. During those terms, Saravanan has gained audience at international level from countries such as Singapore, India, Sri Lanka, France, and the United Nations in New York. 

Saravanan was elected as a member of Majlis Tertinggi MIC in 2003 and then again in 2006, which encouraged Datuk Seri Samy Vellu to elect him as MIC Information Chief and Federal Territory MIC Communications Director.

In the 12th General Election in 2008, Saravanan contested for a Parliament seat for Tapah and won against a candidate from People's Justice Party (PKR). Under the Barisan Nasional coalition and then-Prime Minister, Tun Dato' Seri Abdullah bin Haji Ahmad Badawi, Saravanan was appointed as the Deputy Minister of Federal Territories and Urban Wellbeing from 2008 until 2013. In the 13th General Election, Saravanan also won a seat in the Parliament and was appointed as the Deputy Minister of Youth and Sports from 2013 until 2018. In 2020, Saravanan was appointed as the Minister of Human Resource under the new government coalition, Perikatan Nasional, and Prime Minister Muhyiddin Yassin.

Election results

Honours
  :
  Member of the Order of the Defender of the Realm (AMN) (1998)
  :
  Knight Commander of the Order of the Territorial Crown (PMW) - Datuk (2014)
  Grand Commander of the Order of the Territorial Crown (SMW) - Datuk Seri (2018)
  :
  Companion Class I of the Order of Malacca (DMSM) - Datuk (2007)

References

Living people
1968 births
21st-century Malaysian politicians
People from Selangor
Members of the Dewan Rakyat
Malaysian Indian Congress politicians
Malaysian people of Indian descent
Malaysian politicians of Tamil descent
Members of the Dewan Negara
Members of the Order of the Defender of the Realm